Philacra is a genus of flowering plants belonging to the family Ochnaceae.

Its native range is Venezuela to Northern Brazil.

Species:

Philacra auriculata 
Philacra duidae 
Philacra longifolia 
Philacra steyermarkii

References

Ochnaceae
Malpighiales genera